Serifan may refer to:
Forever People#Serifan, a fictional character
Şarifan, Azerbaijan